In finance, in particular with reference to bonds and swaps, a stub period is a length of time over which interest accrues are not equal to the usual interval between bond coupons.

These periods normally occur because the interval between coupons does not fit neatly into the period for which the bond was issued, thus sometimes a bond's final or first coupon period may be adjusted to make the bond start and mature on the desired dates.

References

External links
 Interest Calculations and the Impact of Stub Periods

Bonds (finance)
Bond valuation